Dodo-Gol (Doodo gol; , Dodo-Gol) is a village located in the Khorinsky District of Buryatia.

Cities and towns in Buryatia